Sara Errani was the defending champion, but withdrew before the tournament due to an adductor problem.

Angelique Kerber was in contention to regain the world No. 1 ranking by winning the title, but lost in the semifinals to Elina Svitolina.

Svitolina went on to win the title, defeating Caroline Wozniacki in the final, 6–4, 6–2.

Seeds
The top eight seeds received a bye into the second round.

Draw

Finals

Top half

Section 1

Section 2

Bottom half

Section 3

Section 4

Qualifying

Seeds

Qualifiers

Lucky loser
  Mandy Minella

Draw

First qualifier

Second qualifier

Third qualifier

Fourth qualifier

Fifth qualifier

Sixth qualifier

Seventh qualifier

Eighth qualifier

References

External links 
 Main draw
 Qualifying draw

Women's Singles
2017 WTA Tour